Cascade Charley is an outdoor 1991 fountain and sculpture by Alice Wingwall, installed in Cascade Courtyard, on the University of Oregon campus in Eugene, Oregon, United States. It is made of concrete, tile, and red marble.

See also
 1991 in art

References

External links
 Cascade Charley: A Water Contemplation Space at the Public Art Archive
 Cascade Charley at Waymarking

1991 establishments in Oregon
1991 sculptures
Concrete sculptures in Oregon
Fountains in Oregon
Marble sculptures in Oregon
Outdoor sculptures in Eugene, Oregon
University of Oregon campus